The Święciany massacre or the Švenčionys massacre took place on 19–20 May 1942 when the Lithuanian Security Police murdered around 400 to 1,200 Poles in the German-occupied village of Święciany (now Švenčionys, Lithuania) and its surroundings.

The massacre was a reprisal action for the assassination of three German officers including Joseph Beck carried out by Soviet partisans. Germans ordered arrests and execution of local Poles, with over 1,200 fatalities among the local Polish populace over the next few days. The reprisals have been carried out by the Lithuanian Security Police under the command of Jonas Maciulevičius. Maciulevičius was sentenced to death and executed in Poland in 1950. In early 2000s Polish Institute of National Remembrance reinvestigated the crime, and concluded that no other living perpetrators of this crime remain identified and alive, closing the investigation in 2005.

See also 
 Švenčionys Ghetto

References

Bibliography 

 

1942 in Lithuania
Generalbezirk Litauen
Lithuania–Poland relations
May 1942 events
Massacres in 1942
Massacres in Lithuania during World War II
Massacres of Poles